Charles Hunt may refer to:

 Charles Hunt (artist) (1803–1877)
 Charles Cooke Hunt (1833–1868), explorer of Western Australia
 Charles Hunt (American football) (born 1983), American football player
 Charles A. Hunt, California politician
 Charles A. Hunt (Wisconsin politician) (1829–1899)
 Charles Edward Hunt (1886–1954), lawyer and politician in Newfoundland
 Charles J. Hunt, American film editor and director
 Charles Wallace Hunt (1813–1911), American mechanical engineer, inventor and business executive
 Charles W. Hunt (politician) (1864–1938), Iowa politician and Federal Trade Commission chair
 Charles W. Hunt (educator), American educator and academic administrator